NetQoS,
which sells network performance management software and services, was co-founded by Joel Trammell in 1999
and acquired by CA Technologies in 2009.

The company's name refers to Network Quality of Service.

Their ReportAnalyzer provides "real-time visibility into network traffic" and seeks to improve network performance.

Offerings introduced shortly before the company was acquired by CA Technologies include:
 Performance Center
 Anomaly Detection
 Network latency calculator

Earlier offerings include:
 SuperAgent
 a software/hardware package to identify applications that use excessive bandwidth

Notability
NetQos' products were cited by over 100 articles regarding NetQos patents and prior art.

References

History of software
American companies established in 1999